Sanne Cant (born 8 October 1990) is a Belgian racing cyclist, who currently competes in cyclo-cross for UCI Cyclo-cross Team IKO–Crelan, and in road cycling for UCI Women's Continental Team . Cant's cousin Loes Sels is also a professional cyclist.

Cant won the World Championship cyclo cross in the elite category in 2017, 2018, 2019, and won the European Cyclo-cross Championship in 2014, 2015 and 2017.

Career

Competing at youth level
In her youth Cant competed in both athletics and duathlon. In 2002, she started cycling, focusing mainly on cyclocross and mountain biking. In her first year as a cyclist she immediately won the provincial championship at the age of 12. In 2003 and 2004, she repeated this feat. Also in 2004, Cant achieved her first major victory, becoming Belgian champion in the 14-year-old category. She then moved into the youth category, continuing her provincial title run, while also capturing the youth MTB title. In 2006, the expectations were high, and she won another provincial title as well as her first national title.

First professional years
Her first professional year was the 2008–2009 season, riding for the Italian Guerciotti-Selle Italia team. Her first podium in a major competition came with 3rd place during the cyclo-cross from Gavere. A month later, she recorded her first victory in the race in Faè di Oderzo. From 1 January 2009, Cant signed with BKCP-Powerplus, the team of Niels Albert.

In preparation for the 2009–2010 season she rode various MTB races, again winning the Belgian championship. The subsequent cyclocross season started well for Cant. She was 4th in the Citadel Cross. Later that season, she won the Belgian cyclo-cross championship.

For the summer season of 2010 Cant decided not to be restricted to mountain bike races and focussed solely on the road. Again, she won the Belgian national cyclo-cross championships.

During the summer of 2011 Cant signed a contract with the Young Telenet-Fidea team, despite the signed contract extension Cant at BKCP-Powerplus. In September 2013 she was awarded a fine of 30,000 euros from the UCI. She rode consistently that season, with her best results being her two 2nd places in the Scheldecross and the Grapes Cross. In January 2012 she took a 3rd Belgian title as well as the bronze at the World Championships at home in Koksijde.

Breakthrough season
In preparation for the 2012–2013 season Cant decided to compete in mountain biking alongside road races. This cyclocross season saw Cant's breakthrough. She started with a number of victories, she won in Kalmthout and in Zonhoven. She continued her momentum and won in Leuven, Essen and Loenhout. During the Roubaix world cup race Cant fell heavily on a muddy descent with American racer Katherine Compton. Cant was taken to the hospital, where it turned out that she had no serious injuries. On 13 January, she won her fourth consecutive Belgian championship. After the World championships Cant won several competitions such, Hoogstraten, Oostmalle and even the best in the general classification in the Bpost bank trophy.

Breakthrough confirmation
After the 2012–2013 season Cant combined road cycling with cyclo-cross. She finished 7th at the Belgian road championships and took silver for the second time at the Belgian mountain bike championships. Cant's winter began two weeks earlier than normal. She rode and won the Supercross Baden in Switzerland. Two weeks later she won the Grand Prix Neerpelt then also won in Laarne. In November she won the Fair Cross Niel, the GP Hasselt and Cyclocross Asper-Gavere. In early 2014 she again became national champion for the fifth time in a row.

Career season
Her preparation for the winter of 2014–2015 contrasted to recent years. She started erratically, but in November she showcased her great form winning the Superprestiege of Zonhoven and her first European title. She went on to record her first victory in the World Cup. A week later she won the Milton Keynes round. With this win, she was the first Belgian ever to lead the World Cup. She also led the UCI Rankings. In January she extended her national title winning run.

The summer of 2015 began with Cant being selected to the national road team. Before the start of the 2015–2016 season Cant said she would contest fewer races with the aim of being fresher in the World championships. Her season started with a third place during the first World Cup round. This was followed by two victories in the Superprestige, where for the first time in its history, a final ranking overall classification for women would be decided. Her first big goal of the season was to defend the European Championship – a goal she was successful in.

In January 2017 she became world champion cyclo-cross and in October 2017 she gained her third European title. On 26 December 2017 Cant won in Heusden-Zolder her 100th victory in the cyclo-cross. On 3 February 2018 Cant won a second world championship. On 2 February 2019 she scored a hattrick by winning the world championship three years in a row.

Major results

Cyclo-cross

2002–2003
 1st  Antwerp U13 Provincial Champion
2003–2004
 1st  Antwerp Junior Provincial Champion
2004–2005
 1st  Antwerp Junior Provincial Champion
2005–2006
 1st  Antwerp Youth Provincial Champion
2006–2007
 1st  National Junior Championships
 1st  Antwerp Youth Provincial Champion
2007–2008
 1st  National Junior Championships
 1st  Antwerp Youth Provincial Champion
2008–2009
 1st  National Junior Championships
 1st Faè di Oderzo
2009–2010
 1st  National Championships
2010–2011
 1st  National Championships
2011–2012
 1st  National Championships
 1st Zonhoven
 1st Leuven
 1st Essen
 1st Azencross Loenhout
 1st Kalmthout
2012–2013
 1st  National Championships
 1st Baden Cyclo-cross
 1st Niel
 1st Hasselt
 1st Gavere – Asper
 1st Hoogstraten
 1st Middelkerke
 1st Oostmalle
 1st Neerpelt
 1st Kalmthout
 1st Essen
 1st Diegem
2013–2014
 1st  National Championships
 1st Neerpelt
 1st Gieten
 1st Zonhoven
 1st Gavere – Asper
 1st Koksijde
 1st Milton Keynes
 1st Scheldecross Antwerpen
 1st Oostmalle
2014–2015
 1st  European Championships
 1st  National Championships
 1st  Overall UCI World Cup
1st Koksijde
1st Milton Keynes
 Superprestige
1st Gieten
1st Zonhoven
1st Ruddervoorde
1st Gavere
1st Hoogstraten
 BPost Bank Trophy
1st Bollekescross
1st Hasselt
 1st Krawatencross Lille
 1st Neerpelt
 1st Niel
 1st Overijse
 1st Sint-Niklaas
 1st Otegem
 1st Oostmalle
 2nd  World Championships
2015–2016
 1st  European Championships
 1st  National Championships
 1st Niel
 1st Hasselt
 1st Maldegem
 1st Eeklo
 1st Oostmalle
 1st Overall Superprestige
1st Gieten
1st Zonhoven
1st Ruddervoorde
1st Gavere
1st Hoogstraten
1st Middelkerke
 1st  Overall UCI World Cup
1st Koksijde
1st Heusden-Zolder
1st Lignières-en-Berry
 1st Overall BPost Bank Trophy
1st Essen
1st Scheldecross Antwerpen
1st Azencross Loenhout
1st Grand Prix Sven Nys
 3rd  World Championships
2016–2017
 1st  World Championships
 1st  National Championships
 1st Overall Superprestige
1st Gieten
1st Zonhoven
1st Gavere
1st Middelkerke
 1st Overall DVV Trofee
1st Flandriencross Hamme
1st Essen
1st Scheldecross Antwerpen
1st Azencross Loenhout
 UCI World Cup
1st Zeven
 Brico Cross
1st Geraardsbergen
1st Hulst
 1st Ardooie
 1st Hasselt
 1st Mol
 1st Niel
 1st Oostmalle
 1st Sint-Niklaas
2017–2018
 1st  World Championships
 1st  European Championships
 1st  National Championships
 1st  Overall UCI World Cup
1st Waterloo
1st Bogense
1st Zeven
1st Heusden-Zolder
1st Hoogerheide
 1st Superprestige
1st Diegem
1st Hoogstraten
1st Middelkerke
 DVV Trofee
1st Flandriencross Hamme
1st Essen
1st Scheldecross Antwerpen
1st Azencross Loenhout
1st Krawatencross Lille
 1st Eeklo
 1st Lebbeke
 1st Meulebeke
 1st Otegem
2018–2019
 1st  World Championships
 1st  National Championships
 1st Overall Superprestige
1st Zonhoven
1st Diegem
1st Hoogstraten
 1st Overall DVV Trofee
1st Niel
1st Krawatencross Lille
 1st Meulebeke
 1st Lokeren
 1st Mol
 1st Sint-Niklaas
2019–2020
 1st  National Championships
 1st Sint-Niklaas
 1st Ereprijs Paul Herygers
2020–2021
 1st  National Championships
 2nd Oostmalle
 3rd Sint-Niklaas
2021–2022
 1st  National Championships
 Ethias Cross
1st Meulebeke
2022–2023
 1st  National Championships

Road racing and mountain biking

2005
 1st  Cadet cross-country, National Mountain Bike Championships
2006
 1st  Junior cross-country, National Mountain Bike Championships
2007
 1st  Junior cross-country, National Mountain Bike Championships
2008
 1st  Junior cross-country, National Mountain Bike Championships
 1st Tubize Mountainbike
 1st Langdorp Mountainbike
2018
 3rd Road race, National Road Championships

References

External links

Living people
1990 births
Belgian female cyclists
Cyclo-cross cyclists
Cyclists from Antwerp
Belgian cyclo-cross champions
UCI Cyclo-cross World Champions (women)
21st-century Belgian women